The high-frequency impact treatment or HiFIT – Method is the treatment of welded steel constructions at the weld transition to increase the fatigue strength.

Features 
The durability and life of dynamically loaded, welded steel structures is determined in many cases by the welds, in particular the weld transitions. Through selective treatment of the transitions (grinding (abrasive cutting), abrasive blasting, hammering, etc.), the durability of many designs increase significantly. Hammering methods have proven to be particularly effective treatment methods and were within the joint project REFRESH extensively studied and developed. The HiFIT (High-Frequency Impact Treatment (also called HFMI (High Frequency Mechanical Impact))) process  is such a hammering method that is universally applicable, requires only a low tech equipment and still offers high reproducibility and the possibility for quality control.

Operation 

The HiFIT hammer operates with a hardened pin with a ball resting on the workpiece with a diameter D of 3 mm.
This pin is hammered with an adjustable intensity at around 180–300 Hz at the weld toe. Local mechanical deformations occur in the form of a treatment track. The weld toe is deformed plastically. The induced compressive residual stress prevents the track cracking and the crack propagation on the surface.

Evidence 
The International Institute of Welding Technology IIW published the Guideline "Recommendations for the HFMI Treatment" in October 2016. An overview of higher frequency hammers (HFMI) is presented, and recommendations for the correct application of the method and quantitative measurements for quality assurance the guideline provides the basis for measurements of HFMI improved welded joints on the basis of all known stress calculation concepts.

In numerous experiments at various institutes and universities an 80 to 100 percent increase of fatigue strength and a 5 – to 15-fold increase in weld-life could be demonstrated. The most extensive research project was from 2006 to 2009 "REFRESH – life extension of existing and new welded steel structures (P702). In this research project, the HiFIT device was developed and made ready for production. This report is available in book form at the FOSTA (Forschungsvereinigung Stahlanwendung e.V.) and can be ordered under the number . The book contains detailed scientific verifications and validations.

Steps in the HiFIT method 
The HiFIT method can be applied to both existing as well as new steel structures.

Preliminary steps 
For a targeted treatment, the visibility and accessibility of the transition in the welded areas are required.
Existing structures typically are prepared at the transition for surface finishing. The parts must be free of loose rust and old paint. If necessary, previous sandblasting is required.

The device operates with a compressed air supply of 6–8 bar.

Steps 
HiFIT device is manually placed on the treated weld transition and during treatment, along this run.

Result 
By local transformations, the weld toe plastically deformed and solidified.
The depth of the aftertreatment track should be between 0.2 and 0.35 mm.
The undercut at the weld toe is no longer recognizable.

Process safety 
By visual inspection, the treated region are examined. The treatment depth can be checked with a special gauge.
A digital display of the operating pressure allows the user to control the entire process.

Economic importance of HiFIT

Lifetime extension 
When applied to existing constructions, the lifetime can be extended considerably. If no macroscopically visible cracks are present, HiFIT is a very suitable remediation tool.
With timely remediation of existing structures there is practically no difference to the life of new treated welds. This gives the potential to use existing constructions far beyond the planned lifetime. The HiFIT-method is used very efficient e.g. at highway bridges in steel hollow box-section design on the fly. Costs for reconstruction are low compared to conventional methods. In the commercial vehicle industry and other industries highly stressed welds on existing and new structures are treated with HiFIT to extend lifetime successfully.

Increasing the transferable load level 
In case of new constructions and for some existing structures the load level for treated welds can be increased. Using constructions for the same lifetime as before welds can transfer 1.6 times loads. This has e.g. for cranes the very positive effect of larger lifting capacity. The efficiency of cranes increases with each stroke.

Lightweight
Taking into account the HiFIT process during development, on same load level and same lifetime, the construction can be slimmed down specifically. Extensive experimental investigations on structural details and FEM-supported-design methods has shown the high efficiency with conventional S235, S355J2 and fine grain steels, such as S460N, S690QL and even higher strength steels. The achievable material saving makes the HiFIT application in most applications already economically viable. Considering the additional benefit of the weight advantage e.g. the achievable payload in vehicles can be increased.

See also 
 Welding
 Ultrasonic impact treatment
 Shot peening
Autofrettage, which produces compressive residual stresses in pressure vessels.

Publications 
 The book REFRESH – life extension of existing and new welded steel structures. can be ordered under the number  at FOSTA – Research Association for Steel Application Association in Germany Düsseldorf.
 Stahlbau September 2009, 78-year, ISSN 0038-9145 A6449
 IIW Recommendations for the HFMI Treatment For Improving the Fatigue Strength of Welded Joints. Autoren: Gary B. Marquis, Zuheir Barsoum, https://www.springer.com/de/book/9789811025037
DASt-Recommendation - 026 Weld Assessment for fatigue stressed constructions, using high frequency impact hammer treatments, Stahlbau Verlags- und Service GmbH, https://shop.deutscherstahlbau.de/de/dast-richtlinie-026

References

External links 
 Website of the Institut for Metal- und Leightweight: Master-Thesis: Einsatz von Hochfrequenzhämmerverfahren zur Steigerung der Ermüdungsfestigkeit von geschweißten Stahlkonstruktionen
 Website of the University Stuttgart: Research-project Anwendung hochfrequenter Hämmerverfahren im Stahlwasserbau

Welding
Pneumatic tools
Hand-held power tools
Power tools
Metallurgical processes
Metalworking